Claude Frei (born 3 April 1933) is a Swiss former professional racing cyclist. He rode in the 1956 Tour de France.

References

External links
 

1933 births
Living people
Swiss male cyclists
Cyclists from Nice